The Saint Petersburg Academic Symphony Orchestra (in ), founded in 1931, is one of the two symphony orchestras belonging to the Saint Petersburg Philharmonia society, the other being the more famous Saint Petersburg Philharmonic Orchestra, founded in the 19th century.

The Saint Petersburg Academic Symphony Orchestra was founded in 1931 as the Leningrad Radio Orchestra. In 1953, it came under the umbrella of Saint Petersburg Philharmonia.

Karl Eliasberg was its music director since 1942 and Aleksandr Dmitriyev has been since 1977.

See also
 Moscow Academic Symphony Orchestra
 Leningrad première of Shostakovich's Symphony No. 7

References

External links
Home page of Saint Petersburg Philharmonia

1931 establishments in Russia
Culture in Saint Petersburg
Musical groups established in 1931
Russian symphony orchestras